Guilty by Association is the debut studio album by State of Shock. This album was only released in Canada. The album includes the singles "Wish I Never Met You","If I Could", and "So Many Times". CD art design by Bobby James.

Track listing
 "Sound Track Of Our Lives"
 "Whatchya Gonna Do"
 "Wish I Never Met You"
 "If I Could"
 "Song I Scream"
 "This is Why"
 "Living Unaware"
 "Sh*t Talker"
 "Breath Again"
 "So Many Times"
 "So What"
 "Rollin"

Band members
Cameron Melnyk: Vocals 
Alison Toews: Bass 
Jesse Wainwright: Guitar, Vocals  
Johnny Philippon: Drums
Simon Clow (Kadooh): Guitar

2007 debut albums
State of Shock (band) albums